Thysanus is a genus of insects belonging to the family Signiphoridae.

The genus has almost cosmopolitan distribution.

Species:
 Thysanus ater Walker, 1840 
 Thysanus coleoptratus Kerrich, 1953

References

Chalcidoidea
Hymenoptera genera